The 2011 FIFA Women's World Cup qualification UEFA Group 7 was a UEFA qualifying group for the 2011 FIFA Women's World Cup. The group comprised Italy, Finland, Portugal, Slovenia and Armenia. 

Italy won the group and advanced to the play-off rounds.

Standings

Results

External links
 Regulations of the European Qualifying Competition for the 6th FIFA Women's World Cup

7
2009–10 in Italian women's football
2010–11 in Italian women's football
2010 in Finnish football
2009 in Finnish football
2010 in Armenian football
2009 in Armenian football
2009–10 in Portuguese women's football
2010–11 in Portuguese women's football
2009–10 in Slovenian football
2010–11 in Slovenian football